The 	Coupe de la Réunion is the top knockout tournament of the Réunion football. It was created in 1957.

Winners
1957 : Bourbon Club 3-2     SS Franco
1958 : SS Jeanne d'Arc (Le Port) 3-0     SS Juniors Dionysiens
1959 : JS Saint-Pierroise 5-1     SS Escadrille
1960 : SS Jeanne d'Arc (Le Port) 2-1     JS Saint Pierroise
1961 : SS Patriote (Saint-Denis) 5-2     Bourbon Club
1962 : JS Saint-Pierroise 5-1 SS Saint-Louisienne
1963 : US Bénédictine 3-1     Stade Saint Paulois
1964 : SS Saint-Louisienne 4-2     US Bénédictine
1965 : Final not played
1966 : SS Patriote (Saint-Denis) 2-1     Bourbon Club
1967 : SS Jeanne d'Arc (Le Port) 2-1 SS Patriote (Saint-Denis)
1968 : SS Saint-Louisienne  4-3     SS Jeanne d'Arc
1969 : SS Saint-Louisienne  5-1     US Saint Joseph
1970 : SS Saint-Louisienne 1-1 4-0 CS Saint-Denis
1971 : JS Saint-Pierroise 1-0 SS Patriote (Saint-Denis)
1972 : US Bénédictine 3-1 SS Saint-Louisienne
1973 : SS Patriote (Saint-Denis)  2-1     JS Saint Pierroise
1974 : CS Saint-Denis 4-1 SS Jeunesse Musulmane
1975 : CS Saint-Denis 3-0 Olympique Dionysiens (Saint-Denis)
1976 : SS Patriote (Saint-Denis) 2-1     CS Saint Denis
1977 : CS Saint-Denis 3-1     JS Saint Pierroise
1978 : CS Saint-Denis 4-1     SS Saint Louisienne
1979 : CS Saint-Denis 1-0     Rivière Sport
1980 : JS Saint-Pierroise 1-0     AS Poussins
1981 : SS Saint-Louisienne 2-0 SS Saint-Pauloise
1982 : US Saint-André Léopards 1-0 CS Saint-Denis
1983 : FC Ouest (Saint-Paul) 2-1 CS Saint-Denis
1984 : JS Saint-Pierroise 4-1 SS Patriote (Saint-Denis)
1985 : CS Saint-Denis 3-1 SS Saint-Pauloise
1986 : CS Saint-Denis 1-0 SS Saint-Pauloise
1987 : SS Saint-Louisienne 2-1     JS Saint Pierroise
1988 : CS Saint-Denis 3-1     SS Gauloise
1989 : JS Saint-Pierroise 2-1 CS Saint-Denis
1990 : SS Patriote (Saint-Denis) 4-2     JS Saint Pierroise
1991 : US Stade Tamponnaise 1-0 SS Saint-Pauloise
1992 : JS Saint-Pierroise 1-0 SS Saint-Louisienne
1993 : JS Saint-Pierroise 3-1 US Stade Tamponnaise
1994 : JS Saint-Pierroise 3-0 US Saint-Andréenne
1995 : SS Saint-Louisienne 1-0 CS Saint-Denis
1996 : SS Saint-Louisienne 4-1 US Stade Tamponnaise
1997 : AS Marsouins (Saint-Leu)  2-2 JS Saint Pierroise     [aet, 5-4 pen]
1998 : SS Saint-Louisienne 1-0 AS Marsouins (Saint-Leu)
1999 : SS Saint-Louisienne 1-1 (3 - 1) US Stade Tamponnaise
2000 : US Stade Tamponnaise 1-0 SS Excelsior (Saint-Joseph)
2001 : SS Jeanne d'Arc (Le Port) 1-0 SS Excelsior (Saint-Joseph)
2002 : SS Saint-Louisienne 3-2 JS Saint-Pierroise
2003 : US Stade Tamponnaise 2-1 SS Saint-Louisienne
2004 : SS Excelsior (Saint-Joseph) 2-1 US Stade Tamponnaise
2005 : SS Excelsior (Saint-Joseph) 3-2 Saint-Denis FC
2006 : Saint-Pauloise FC (Saint-Paul) 2-0 SS Excelsior
2007 : AS Marsouins 2-1 US Stade Tamponnaise
2008 : US Stade Tamponnaise 1-0 SS Excelsior
2009 : US Stade Tamponnaise 2-0 SS Jeanne d'Arc
2010 : US Sainte-Marienne 1-0 US Stade Tamponnaise
2011 : Saint-Pauloise FC (Saint-Paul) 1-0 (aet) SS Saint-Louisienne
2012 : US Stade Tamponnaise  1-0 Saint-Denis FC
2013 : SS Saint-Louisienne 2-1 JS Saint-Pierroise
2014 : SS Excelsior (Saint-Joseph) 4-0 Saint-Pauloise FC
2015 : SS Excelsior (Saint-Joseph) 2-0 JS Saint-Pierroise
2016–17 : AS Sainte-Suzanne 1-1 (aet, 5–3 pen.) AS Marsouins
2018 : JS Saint-Pierroise 1-0 SS Excelsior
2019 : JS Saint-Pierroise 1-0 SS Jeanne d'Arc
2020 : Not played 
2021 : AS Saint-Louisienne 6-3 JS Sainte-Annoise

Performance By Club

References

External links
Summary at RSSSF

Football competitions in Réunion
Reunion
Reu
Recurring sporting events established in 1957
1957 establishments in Réunion